Do Cheshmeh may refer to:
 Do Cheshmeh, Hamadan
 Do Cheshmeh, Kermanshah